The 49er and 49er FX is a two-handed skiff-type high-performance sailing dinghy. The two crew work on different roles with the helm making many tactical decisions, as well as steering, and the crew doing most of the sail control. Both of the crew are equipped with their own trapeze and sailing is done while cantilevered over the water to the fullest extent to balance against the sails.

The 49er was designed by Julian Bethwaite (the son of Frank Bethwaite) and developed by a consortium consisting of Bethwaites, Performance Sailcraft Japan, Peter Johnston, and Ovington boats. The boat has been an Olympic class since it was selected by the International Sailing Federation to be the men's high performance double handed dinghy Sydney Summer Games of 2000. Its derivative featuring a re-designed rig, the 49er FX, was selected by World Sailing to be the women's high performance double-hander at the Rio Summer Olympics of 2016.

History
It incorporates ideas developed in Julian Bethwaite's 18ft Skiffs, notably the Prime Computer series of boats, which were double handers.

To handle a large and powerful sail area, the mast uses a square topped sail that causes the upper main to twist off and flatten, allowing a controllable sail with fast gust response and reducing the heeling moment. The use of solid wings, rather than tubes as on similar boats (RS800 etc.), makes it easier for the crew to run across the deck from gunwale to gunwale during maneuvers.

The 49er made its first Olympic appearance at the Sydney Olympics in 2000 and has continued to grow in popularity ever since.

With a Portsmouth yardstick Handicap of 740 the 49er is the fastest two person one-design monohull dinghy.

In 2009 the boat received a new rig design, including a larger fully carbon mast (replacing the aluminum mast) and square top (roach) mainsail.

Construction
As a one design class, the 49er has two licensed suppliers, Mackay Boats in Oceania and Ovington in Europe.

Hull
The hull is made of Epoxy GRP and foam sandwich laminate with carbon fibre in high load areas. It includes two solid wings, also called racks, that clip into the side to increase righting moment of the trapezing crew. Its length was fixed at 4.99 metres because the ISAF brief for the high performance Olympic class dinghy called for a 5-metre boat, but Tokao Otani, a member of the development consortium, pointed out that there was a tariff in Japan for boats over 5 metres long. It has a fine entry to efficiently transition between the low speed displacement, and high speed planing modes. According to the International 49er class rules, the minimum hull weight including all permanent fittings can not be less than 94.0 kg.

Racing
49er and 49erFX racing is incredibly competitive. Teams race for Olympic glory, with the pinnacle sought being the Olympic Games every four years. Some of the biggest superstars of sailing have emerged from 49er sailing including:
- 1997-1999 World Champion Chris Nicholson who went on to lead multiple Volvo Ocean Race campaigns
- 2002, 2004, and 2010 World Champions Iker Martinez de Lizarduy and Xabier Fernández who each went on to lead multiple Volvo Ocean Race campaigns
- 2009, 2011, and 2012 World Champion Nathan Outteridge who lead the ArtemisAmerica's Cup team and the Japanese Sail GP team
- 2013-2016 World Champions Peter Burling and Blair Tuke won the 2017 America's Cup and each narrowly lost out on winning the 2018 Volvo Ocean Race

Racing for the 49er class can best be followed via 49er.org

Spars
Southern Spars, part of the North Technology Group, is the licensed supplier of the 49er mast. It is a three piece male-moulded assembly made from 100% standard modulus carbon. It is 7.0 meters tall and capable of supporting a combined crew weight up to 165 kg from its dual trapeze. The mast is braced by three sets of shrouds that connect to a fitting on the side of the boat. The crew is able to adjust them by tightening or loosening them, depending on the wind speed and sea states.

The boom is made from an aluminium alloy extrusion.

Foils
The rudder and daggerboard are made out from a composite of epoxy, carbon and glass, covered by a hard gelcoat surface. The head of each class legal foil carries the embossed 49er logo and the ICA label.

Sails
The 49er contains three sails: a main sail, jib, and spinnaker. The main and jib are 20 square meters, fully battened and made of reinforced Mylar (film polyester). The main was redesigned in 2007 from a full, curved roach plan to having a square on top in order to provide more sail area and to control more shape adjustment. The spinnaker is 38 square meters in a tri-radial asymmetric shape.

Events

Olympics

Men's 49er

Women's 49er FX

World Championships

Men's 49er

Women's 49er FX

Related boats

The 49er FX was developed by Mackay Boats to be a women's Olympic class. It consists of a 49er hull, wings, and foils, with a scaled down rig designed to suit the weight of an elite female crew.

The 29er is a smaller, single trapeze trainer to the 49er. It has become popular in North America, Europe and Australia as a fast youth boat. Recently the 29erXX, a twin trapeze version of the 29er, has been produced with a rig very similar to the 49er.

The 59er dinghy was put into production in Australia and the UK in 2002. It is a non-trapeze, 4.7m (15 feet 5 inches) sailing dinghy, rigged with an asymmetrical spinnaker. It is designed for a crew weight of 145 kg to 180 kg (320 lb to 400 lb).

References

External links

 International 49er Class Association
 UK 49er Class Association
  ISAF 49er Microsite